Alto Biobío National Reserve is a nature reserve located in the easternmost portion of Upper Bío-Bío River basin, in the La Araucanía Region, Chile. The vegetation is dominated by Andean steppe with scattered Araucaria trees.

Alto Biobío National Reserve is part of the Araucarias Biosphere Reserve.

The reserve is crossed by the route that connects Chile and Argentina via Pino Hachado Pass.

References

Protected areas of La Araucanía Region
National reserves of Chile
1912 establishments in Chile
Protected areas established in 1912